Aliaksandr Bersanau (Łacinka: Aliaksandr Biarsanaŭ; born 1 September 1992) is a Belarusian Olympic weightlifter. He competed at the 2016 Summer Olympics and placed eighth in the 94 kg weight division.

Results

References

External links 

 
 
 

1992 births
Living people
Belarusian male weightlifters
Weightlifters at the 2016 Summer Olympics
Olympic weightlifters of Belarus